Murud may refer to:

 Murud, Iran, a village in Alborz Province, Iran
 Murud, Latur, a town in Latur district, Maharashtra, India
 Murud, Raigad, a town in Raigad district, Maharashtra, India
 Murud-Janjira, a fort on an island near Murud, Raigad
 Murud, Ratnagiri, a town in Ratnagiri district, Maharashtra, India
 Mount Murud, a mountain in Sarawak, Malaysia.